The 2001 IIHF World Women's Championships Division I (formerly Pool 'B') were held between March 20 – March 25, 2001 in the city of Briançon, France.  Switzerland won the tournament with a narrow 2–1 victory over Japan in the final.

For the third consecutive year the number of participants grew, with this year's third tier having ten nations in two groups.  The two groups played independent of each other in Bucharest, Romania and Maribor, Slovenia.  Initially the two group winners, Slovakia and the Netherlands, were promoted to Division I with Denmark and Norway being relegated to Division I Qualification.  However, before the 2003 season was played the formation of the divisions were changed.

The women's tiers were reformatted for 2003, so there would be a top level of eight teams, and Divisions I, II, III each with 6 teams.  The winner of the  2001 Division I tournament was promoted to the 2003 World Championship, replacing the nation relegated from there.  The relegated team and the next five placed nations formed Division I for 2003.  The bottom two teams from 2001 Division I along with the top four nations from the two qualifying tournaments formed the 2003 Division II.  All remaining participants proceeded to the 2003 Division III.

World Championship Division I

The eight participating teams were divided up into two seeded groups as below. The teams played each other once in a single round robin format. The top two teams from the group proceeded to the Final Round, while the remaining teams played in the consolation round. In the placing rounds, the first place teams played each other for the promotion, while the fourth place teams were relegated.

First round

Group A

Results
All times local

Group B

Results
All times local

Playoff round

Match for seventh place

Match for fifth place

Match for third place

Final

Scoring leaders

Goaltending leaders

Champions

Final standings

2003 Division I Qualification
At the time these tournaments were played it was understood that the winner of each group would be promoted to Division I for 2003.  With the reorganization of the lower tiers into smaller groups the winners and second-place finishers of both tournaments were sent to Division II, with the remaining six nations comprising Division III.

Group A
Played in Bucharest Romania March 5–11, 2001.

Netherlands and Italy qualified in 2003 World Championship Division II

Scoring leaders

Goaltending leaders

Group B
Played in Maribor Slovenia March 20–25, 2001.

Slovakia and Great Britain qualified in 2003 World Championship Division II

Scoring leaders

Goaltending leaders

References

External links
 Summary from the Women's Hockey Net
 Detailed summary from passionhockey.com
 Official IIHF Division I page
 Official IIHF Division I Qualification Group A page
 Official IIHF Division I Qualification Group B page

Lower
World
2001
Women's World Ice Hockey Championships (Lower Divisions)
Women's World Ice Hockey Championships (Lower Divisions)
Women's sports competitions in France